Serena Williams defeated Maria Sharapova in the final, 6–4, 6–3 to win the singles tennis title at the 2012 WTA Tour Championships. It was her third Tour Finals singles title, and she did not lose a set during the tournament.

Petra Kvitová was the defending champion, but withdrew after her first match due to nasopharyngitis.   

Angelique Kerber and Sara Errani made their debuts at the event.

Players

Alternates

Draw

Finals

Red group
Standings are determined by: 1. number of wins; 2. number of matches; 3. in two-players-ties, head-to-head records; 4. in three-players-ties, percentage of sets won, or of games won; 5. steering-committee decision.

White group
Standings are determined by: 1. number of wins; 2. number of matches; 3. in two-players-ties, head-to-head records; 4. in three-players-ties, percentage of sets won, or of games won; 5. steering-committee decision.

References
General

Specific

Singles 2012
WTA Tour Championships